Virginia Blanton is Curators' Distinguished Professor of English Language and Literature at the University of Missouri–Kansas City and eminent scholar in Early English Studies.

Life
She graduated from Southwestern College, with a B.A. in English and Foreign Languages in 1989; from Binghamton University with a M.A. in English in 1991, and Ph.D. in English in 1998. She also holds an interdisciplinary Graduate Certificate in Medieval Studies from the Center for Medieval and Renaissance Studies at Binghamton University, 1995.

Her scholarly work has re-shaped conceptions of female spirituality in the early Middle Ages. Particularly in her work on saints' lives, Blanton has demonstrated that the lives of female saints such as Æthelthryth and their later cults offer powerful insights into the devotional lives of men and women in the Middle Ages. Her first book, Signs of Devotion: The Cult of St. Æthelthryth in Medieval England, 695–1615 received the Best First Book award from the Society for Medieval Feminist Scholarship in 2008. Blanton's later work focusses on the role of nuns in medieval book production and manuscript culture.

Works
 Signs of Devotion: The Cult of St. Æthelthryth in Medieval England, 695-1615. Penn State Press, 2007, ; paperback, 2010, .
 V. Blanton, H. Scheck (eds.) Intertexts: Studies in Anglo-Saxon Culture Presented to Paul E. Szarmach, Medieval and Renaissance Texts and Studies, 2008, .
 V. Blanton, V. O'Mara, P. Stoop (eds.) Nuns' Literacies in Medieval Europe: The Hull Dialogue, Brepols, 2013, .
 V. Blanton, V. O'Mara, P. Stoop (eds.) Nuns' Literacies in Medieval Europe: The Kansas City Dialogue, Brepols, 2015, .
 V. Blanton, V. O'Mara, P. Stoop (eds.) Nuns' Literacies in Medieval Europe: The Antwerp Dialogue, Brepols, 2017, .

References

External links

Year of birth missing (living people)
Living people
Binghamton University alumni
Southwestern College (Kansas) alumni
University of Missouri–Kansas City faculty